Arrest Bulldog Drummond is a 1938 American crime thriller film directed by James P. Hogan.

Plot 
Bulldog (John Howard) and Algy (Reginald Denny), in the midst of preparations for the former's wedding in London, are summoned to more important matters at the house of an eccentric scientist who has invented a prototype electric "death-ray" device which has the potential to revolutionize warfare. They find the scientist murdered in mysterious circumstances upon their arrival, and set out to find out what is going on and the culprit, aka The Stinger - leading to trouble with Scotland Yard, a dock-yard knife-fight which puts the Bulldog on the missing-in-action list temporarily, and a trip to the tropics to foil a master criminal's attempt to sell the secret weapon to a foreign power for the highest price. Phyllis Clavering (Heather Angel), Drummond's fiancée, goes on a cruise with her aunt Meg (Zeffie Tilbury) to the tropics, where she brings Drummond to the crooks, Lady Beryl Ledyard (Jean Fenwick) and Rolf Alferson (George Zucco).

Cast 
John Howard as Capt. Hugh Chesterton "Bulldog" Drummond
Heather Angel as Phyllis Clavering
H.B. Warner as Col. J.A. Nielson
Reginald Denny as Algernon "Algy" Longworth
E.E. Clive as "Tenny" Tennison
Jean Fenwick as Lady Beryl Ledyard
Zeffie Tilbury as Aunt Meg
George Zucco as Rolf Alferson
Leonard Mudie as Richard Gannett
Evan Thomas as John Smith
Clyde Cook as Short, Mustachio'd Constable (Sacker)
David Clyde as Tall, Cleanshaven Constable (McThane)
George Regas as Soongh, Lady Beryl's man
Neil Fitzgerald as Sir Malcolm McLeonard
Claud Allister as Sir Basil Leghorne
Forrester Harvey as Constable Severn
John Sutton as Inspector Tredennis

References

External links 

1930s science fiction adventure films
1938 films
American black-and-white films
1930s English-language films
Films based on Bulldog Drummond
Films directed by James Patrick Hogan
American science fiction adventure films
Paramount Pictures films
1930s American films